Surjay Pariyar (born 8 October 1992 in Mangan, India) is an Indian professional footballer who plays as a goalkeeper for Rangdajied United F.C. in the I-League.

Career

Early career
Pariyar was born in Mangan, India honed his basic football skills at the Sports Academy of Sikkim, Gangtok and moved on to play professional football after he completed his course at the Academy.

Rangdajied
Pariyar made his debut for Rangdajied United F.C. in the I-League on 22 September 2013 against Prayag United S.C. at the Salt Lake Stadium in which he started and played the full match as Rangdajied United lost the match 0–2.

Career statistics

References

External links 
 I-League Profile.

1992 births
Living people
People from Mangan district
Indian footballers
Rangdajied United F.C. players
Association football goalkeepers
Footballers from Sikkim
I-League players
NorthEast United FC players
Indian Super League players